The Network of enlightened Women (NeW) is an organization for culturally conservative women at American universities. Started as a book club at the University of Virginia in 2004, NeW seeks to cultivate "a community of conservative women and expands intellectual diversity on college campuses through its focus on education." 

NeW members meet to discuss issues ranging from politics and gender to conservative principles. Since its founding, NeW has expanded to over 20 colleges campuses nationwide. It has grown into the nation’s premier organization for conservative college women.

Founding
NeW was founded in September 2004 by Karin Agness as a book club at the University of Virginia (UVa). Agness found the feminist environment at UVa hostile to conservative women. "I loved being around other conservative women and wanted to find more women like that at UVa," said Agness, who hails from Indianapolis. "Unfortunately, all the women's groups on campus were really liberal and biased. And when I asked a [women's studies professor] if anybody would be interested in sponsoring a conservative women's group, she just laughed at me." In response, she founded NeW as an alternative to the liberal groups for women on campus.  Within a year of its founding at UVa, NeW began to spread nationally.

Activities
While NeW chapters continue to read books together to become better educated, their members also seek to engage their larger campus communities by hosting speakers, holding debates, promoting chivalrous behavior through a "Gentlemen’s Showcase," and challenging the controversial play The Vagina Monologues.

The national organization also hosts an annual national conference in Washington, DC each summer.

National conference
Each summer, NeW leaders, NeW supporters and those interested in learning more about NeW gather in Washington, DC for the annual NeW National Conference. The 2010 conference brought more than 60 women together, and Christina Hoff Sommers (author of Who Stole Feminism? How Women Have Betrayed Women and The War Against Boys: How Misguided Feminism Is Harming Our Young Men) was the keynote speaker. The Heritage Foundation's Insider Magazine praised the conference, and noted that NeW women are "hard at work... bringing intellectual diversity back to campus", commending NeW for "rescuing feminism from the feminists."

Gentlemen's Showcase
Each spring, NeW hosts the NeW Gentlemen’s Showcase, which is a national event recognizing and honoring gentlemen on college campuses. The event seeks to encourage mutual respect between the sexes on campuses. Nominees are submitted through Facebook and are voted on by students from all over the country. Some individual chapters also host their own college-wide contest.

In an op-ed in the Richmond Times-Dispatch, Agness discussed the Gentlemen's Showcase, concluding, "There are still gentlemen on college campuses. And with a little encouragement, there will be more. Instead of trying to change men on campus, we should seek to bring out the best in them. And this lesson applies to women as well."

The Vagina Monologues and V-Day
NeW has attracted attention for its campaign against the performance of The Vagina Monologues and the corresponding observance of V-Day. NeW members, including Agness, wrote articles criticizing Eve Ensler's play as vulgar, demeaning, and offensive, arguing that the explicit content and anatomical obsession of the play has made feminists "their own greatest enemy."

Reception
NeW has been profiled in TIME, The Washington Times, Politico, More magazine, Townhall Magazine and many other media outlets. In October 2006, the comic strip Mallard Fillmore featured NeW twice.

Repeatedly, NeW has been praised for equipping young women on campus to engage in intellectual discussions and for representing a view of women and feminism that has for too long been silenced or ignored on the collegiate level. Writing in The Washington Times, Rebecca Hagelin called NeW "feminine defenders" and notes the increased interest in the work done by NeW ladies on college campuses all over the country.

NeW chapters
NeW has more than 20 chapters across the United States, including at the University of Virginia,  University of South Florida, Cornell University, University of Florida, Arizona State University, University of North Carolina at Chapel Hill, University of Vermont and Ohio State University.

Reading list
On the NeW website, the organization lists the following books as "suggested reading" for their book clubs:

See also

Women in conservatism in the United States

References

External links 
 
NeW official blog
Speech by Karin Agness on the growth of NeW
Complete text and audio of speech by Karin Agness on the founding and growth of "NeW", delivered at the University of Virginia's Miller Center of Public Affairs. from AmericanRhetoric.com

Women's organizations based in the United States
Political organizations based in the United States
Organizations established in 2004
2004 establishments in Virginia